Jakaltek may refer to:
the Jakaltek people
the Jakaltek language